Ghyslain Tremblay (April 29, 1951 – April 7, 2020) was a Canadian actor and comedian.

Tremblay was married to actress Danielle Brassard-Leduc. They had two sons before divorcing. He died at age 68 from COVID-19 in the Montreal borough of Verdun, during the pandemic in Montreal; he had been suffering of Alzheimer's disease for ten years.

Filmography
Les 100 tours de Centour (1971)
L'Âge de la machine (1977)
Pop Citrouille (1979-1983)
Frédéric (1980)
Chiens chauds (1980)
The Plouffe Family (1981)
Les Brillant (1981-1982)
La Plante (1983)
Le Parc des braves (1984-1988)
Robin et Stella (1988)
Le Chemin de Damas (1988)
Pas de répit pour Mélanie (1990)
Cormoran (1990)
Avec un grand A (1991)
Montréal P.Q. (1992)
Là tu parles! (1993-1995)
La Petite Vie (1995)
Lapoisse et Jobard (1997)
The Revenge of the Woman in Black (1997)
Les Mille Merveilles de l'univers (1997)
The Widow of Saint-Pierre (2000)
Father and Sons (2003)
Juniper Tree (2003)
Premier juillet, le film (2004)
The Cop, the Criminal and the Clown (2004)
Idole instantanée (2005)
Les Invincibles (2005) 
Ramdam (2006-2008) (final TV role)

References

External links

1951 births
2020 deaths
Canadian male film actors
Canadian male television actors
Canadian male comedians
Comedians from Quebec
Male actors from Quebec
French Quebecers
People from Saguenay, Quebec
Deaths from the COVID-19 pandemic in Canada